Mechanicville is a city in Saratoga County, New York, United States. The population was 5,196 at the time of the 2010 census. It is the smallest city by area in the state. The name is derived from the occupations of early residents.

The city is located on the eastern border of Saratoga County and is north of Albany, the state capital. Mechanicville borders the towns of Stillwater (of which it was once a part) and Halfmoon in the county, and the town of Schaghticoke, Rensselaer County.

History

The first listing of a settlement on Thenendehowa Creek is in 1721. At that time, Cornelius Van Buren had a sawmill at the mouth of the creek where it emptied into the Hudson River.

The first documented occurrence of the name "Mechanicville" dates back to 1829. The name comes from the early settlers, who were independent mastercraftsmen such as millers, carpenters, or butchers, whose professions were commonly known as the "mechanical arts" at the time.

About 35 years later, small flour mills were already established. When the Champlain Canal reached the settlement in 1823, and especially when the Rensselaer and Saratoga Railroad laid a track through the area in 1835, Mechanicville became an important commerce interchange.

The community became an incorporated village in 1859, when it had about 1000 inhabitants. It grew rapidly as textile mills, factories, and a linen thread company came to Mechanicville.

The first conspicuous casualty of the American Civil War, Elmer E. Ellsworth, was buried in Mechanicville in 1861.

In 1878, additional railways came to the village, and it became an important center of papermaking.

In 1898, Robert Newton King built a hydroelectric power plant on the Hudson River. The Mechanicville Hydroelectric Plant is now the oldest continuously-operating hydroelectric plant in the United States and was listed on the National Register of Historic Places in 1989.

By 1900, Mechanicville was a major transfer yard and car repair center for the railways. In the 1920s, Mechanicville had a population of nearly 10,000.

In both the 1900 and 1910 censuses, Mechanicville was enumerated with the town of Half Moon, just to the south of Stillwater.

Mechanicville became a city in 1915. By 1932, it became the terminal of the first experimental high-voltage direct-current (HVDC) scheme in the U.S.: the HVDC Mechanicville–Schenectady line.

With the decline of the railroads, Mechanicville suffered. The largest paper mill in the world, which Mechanicville had hosted since 1904, ceased operations in 1971, and the once thriving industrial city is today a quiet residential city, with most inhabitants working in Albany, Schenectady, and other nearby communities.

On November 1, 2001, Mechanicville was featured on the Daily Show with then-rising comedian Steve Carell. The Mechanicville Hydroelectric Plant and Col. Elmer E. Ellsworth Monument and Grave are listed on the National Register of Historic Places.

Mechanicville-Stillwater tornado

On May 31, 1998, a large tornado tore through Mechanicville and the adjacent town of Stillwater. It was spawned by a series of severe storms in the late afternoon, causing major damage to the town's old industrial section located on US Route 4 and NY-32, along the Hudson River. One of the two historic smokestacks (visible from two miles away) was knocked down by the tornado. In 2005, the other smokestack and the conjoined building were bulldozed. Houses on the Viall Avenue hill sections of Mechanicville and Stillwater were completely destroyed. The tornado was rated F3 on the Fujita scale (winds estimated at 165 MPH).

Rail yard
In January 2012, a new intermodal and automotive terminal opened on the site of a former Boston and Maine rail yard. The new rail yard was built by Pan Am Southern, a joint venture between Pan Am Railways and Norfolk Southern.

The $40 million facility Is also used for filet-toupee operations, converting double stack container trains from the west to single stack by removing the top layer of containers. This allows the rest of the train to proceed east along track that lacks double stack clearance, particularly the 4 mile Hoosac Tunnel. The removed containers are trucked to local destinations. Toupee refers to the reverse process, where a single stack train coming from the east has additional containers placed on top for the rest of its trip.
Some 300 trucks a day visit the site. The automotive terminal opened in 2014.

Geography
Mechanicville is located at  (42.903922, -73.690458).

The city of Mechanicville is on the west bank of the Hudson River at the influx of the Anthony Kill. US Route 4, and conjoined New York State Route 32 are north-south highways through Mechanicville. New York State Route 67 intersects NY-32 and US-4 in the city. County Roads 75 and 1345 also lead into the city.

Religion 

While Mechanicville has historically had many religious institutions, there are currently two active churches in the city, the Catholic parish of All Saints on the Hudson, and the Mechanicville United Methodist Church.

Notable people  
Orie Amodeo, musician in the Lawrence Welk orchestra
Aida Brewer, first female treasurer of the state of New York
Chad Brown, Thoroughbred horse racing trainer
Joe Cocozzo, professional football player and Super Bowl XXIX participant
Bob Eberly and Ray Eberle, big band singers
Elmer E. Ellsworth, friend and law clerk to Abraham Lincoln, colonel in the Union Army, leader of the Fire Zouaves, and first conspicuous casualty of the American Civil War. 
John R. Fellows, lawyer, politician, and Confederate soldier
Ray Heindorf, songwriter, composer, conductor, and arranger
Erika Holzer, novelist, essayist, and lawyer
Fred Isabella, dentist and politician
John Gavin Nolan, bishop of the Military Ordinariate of the United States
Margaret Bloodgood Peeke, traveler, lecturer, author
Gordon A. Sheehan, animator for Fleischer Studios
Harrison B. Tordoff, ornithologist, conservationist, author, and fighter pilot
George Herbert Whitney, New York state assemblyman and senator

Demographics

As of the census of 2000, there were 5,019 people, 2,219 households, and 1,275 families residing in the city. The population density was 6,028.4 people per square mile (2,334.8/km2). There were 2,386 housing units at an average density of 2,865.8 per square mile (1,109.9/km2). The racial makeup of the city was 97.95% White, 0.36% African American, 0.10% Native American, 0.66% Asian, 0.44% from other races, and 0.50% from two or more races. Hispanic or Latino of any race were 1.20% of the population.

There were 2,219 households, out of which 29.1% had children under the age of 18 living with them, 40.9% were married couples living together, 12.3% had a female householder with no husband present, and 42.5% were non-families. 36.5% of all households were made up of individuals, and 19.4% had someone living alone who was 65 years of age or older. The average household size was 2.26 and the average family size was 2.97.

In the city, the population was spread out, with 24.4% under the age of 18, 8.2% from 18 to 24, 30.1% from 25 to 44, 18.5% from 45 to 64, and 18.7% who were 65 years of age or older. The median age was 36 years. For every 100 females, there were 89.0 males. For every 100 females age 18 and over, there were 82.7 males.

The median income for a household in the city was $34,509, and the median income for a family was $42,143. Males had a median income of $32,825 versus $25,143 for females. The per capita income for the city was $17,236. About 6.5% of families and 8.0% of the population were below the poverty line, including 9.5% of those under age 18 and 7.4% of those age 65 or over.

See also

 Mechanicville High School

References

External links

 Mechanicville City Court

Cities in New York (state)
New York (state) populated places on the Hudson River
Cities in Saratoga County, New York